Hochstadt am Main is a municipality in the district of Lichtenfels in Bavaria in Germany. It lies on the river Main.

References

Lichtenfels (district)